Ángel Barlocco (born 14 December 1899, date of death unknown) was a Uruguayan footballer. He played in two matches for the Uruguay national football team in 1924. He was also part of Uruguay's squad for the 1924 South American Championship.

References

External links
 

1899 births
Year of death missing
Uruguayan footballers
Uruguay international footballers
Place of birth missing
Association football forwards
Defensor Sporting players
Club Nacional de Football players
Montevideo Wanderers F.C. players